Maram al-Masri (born 2 August 1962) is a Syrian writer, living in Paris. She is considered "one of the most renowned and captivating feminine voices of her generation" in Arabic.

Biography
Born in the coastal city of Latakia to a well-known Sunni Muslim family, Maram al-Masri studied English Literature in Damascus, although she interrupted her studies when she fell in love with a man of Christian faith. The relationship failed because of the opposition of the man's family  (interfaith marriage was forbidden in Syrian law) and in 1982, Maram al-Masri emigrated to France, where she married a Syrian, whom she divorced later. In her book Le rapt she picks up the issue of having been unable to see her son for 13 years, because he was taken to Syria by his father after she remarried. She has another two children with her French husband, from whom she separated, too.

She wrote poetry from a young age "to distinguish herself from the other girls and to attract attention",  publishing in literary magazines in Damascus. Her first collection was published there in 1984 under the title I alerted you with a white dove, but her public breakthrough came in 1997 with the book A red cherry on a white-tiled floor, published by the Tunisian Ministry of Culture, as it was considered "too erotic" by Syrian publishers. In 2002, the book was published in a Spanish translation which obtained an immediate positive echo with several reprints, and shortly afterwards, the French and English translations appeared. Maram al-Masri started to publish regularly in the French market and took up writing poetry in French, too. Although her writings "do not address the Arab reader because their language and their thoughts are different to mine", most of her work is still written in Standard Arabic.

Her poetry has been described as "direct, unadorned writing, with its emphasis on the quotidian", where the "utilization of simple, almost child-like metaphors, contrasts sharply with the conventions of traditional Arabic love poetry". "That a woman write so unreservedly about sex" also "lends a fresh, unexpected quality" to her poetry. The Guardian described her as "a love poet whose verse spares no truth of love’s joys and mercilessness"

Besides publishing regularly in Spanish book market, some of her works have been translated also into Italian, Catalan and Corsican, with some samples in German, and she is a frequent guest at poetry gatherings in several European countries, from Ireland  to Italy.

She has received several prizes, like the "Adonis Prize" of the Lebanese Cultural Forum, the "Premio Citta di Calopezzati" and the "Prix d'Automne 2007" of the Societe des gens de letters.

Maram al-Masri has taken a firm stand against the Assad regime in Syria  and considers that "every decent person is with the Revolution". Her poetry book Elle va nue la liberté [Freedom, she comes naked] (2014) is based on social media images of the civil war. Although she defines herself as an Atheist, she justifies the use of religious slogans in the Syrian uprising as a "last opium" which cannot be taken away from people brutally oppressed by a dictatorship.

Selected works 
 I alerted you with a white dove (Andhartuka bi hamāmaẗ beidāʼ) (1984)
 A red cherry on a white-tiled floor [Karzaẗ ḥamrāʼ ʿalá balāṭ abyad] (2003)
 I look at you [Anẓuru ilayk] (2007)
 Wallada's return [ʿAudaẗ Wallada] (2010)
 Freedom, she comes naked (Elle va nue la liberté (2014)
 The abduction [Le rapt] (2015)

References

1962 births
Living people
Syrian poets
People from Latakia
Syrian women poets